Kayastha (also referred to as Kayasth) denotes a cluster of disparate Indian communities broadly categorised by the regions of the Indian subcontinent in which they were traditionally locatedthe Chitraguptavanshi Kayasthas of North India, the Chandraseniya Kayastha Prabhus of Maharashtra, the Bengali Kayasthas of Bengal and Karanas of Odisha. All of them were traditionally considered "writing castes", who had historically served the ruling powers as administrators, ministers and record-keepers.

The earliest known reference to the term Kayastha dates back to the Kushan Empire, when it evolved into a common name for a writer or scribe. In the Sanskrit literature and inscriptions, it was used to denote the holders of a particular category of offices in the government service.

Over the centuries, the occupational histories of Kayastha communities largely revolved around scribal services. However, these scribes did not simply take dictation but acted in the range of capacities better indicated by the term "secretary". They used their training in law, literature, court language, accounting, litigation and many other areas to fulfill responsibilities in all these venues. Kayasthas, along with Brahmins, had access to formal education as well as their own system of teaching administration, including accountancy, in the early-medieval India.

Modern scholars list them among Indian communities that were traditionally described as "urban-oriented", "upper caste" and part of the "well-educated" pan-Indian elite, alongside Punjabi Khatris, Kashmiri Pandits, Parsis, Nagar Brahmins of Gujarat, Chitpawans and Chandraseniya Kayastha Prabhus (CKPs) of Maharashtra, South-Indian Brahmins including Deshastha Brahmins from Southern parts of India and upper echelons of the Muslim as well as Christian communities that made up the middle class at the time of Indian independence in 1947.

Origins

Etymology 
According to Merriam-Webster, the word Kāyastha is probably formed from the Sanskrit kāya (body), and the suffix -stha (standing, being in).

As a class of administrators 
As evidenced by literary and epigraphical texts, Kayasthas had emerged as a 'class of administrators' between late-ancient and early-mediaeval period of Indian history. Their emergence is explained by modern scholars as a result of growth of state machinery, complication of taxation system and the "rapid expansion of land-grant practice that required professional documenting fixation". The term also finds mention in an inscription of the Gupta emperor Kumaragupta I, dated to 442 CE, in which prathama-kāyastha is used as an administrative designation.

According to Romila Thapar, the offices that demanded formal education including that of a kayastha were generally occupied by the "Brahmins, revenue collectors, treasurers and those concerned with legal matters".

In Buddhist association 
According to Chitrarekha Gupta, it is possible that Buddhists, in their effort to create an educated non-Brahmin class, strove to popularize the utility of education and fostered those vocations that required a knowledge of writing. This is corroborated in Udāna, where the lekha-sippa ('craft of writing'), was regarded as the highest of all the crafts. It is also backed by the fact that the earliest epigraphical records mentioning lekhaka ('writer') or kayastha have been made in association with Buddhism.

As an independent guild of professionals 
It is possible that kayasthas may have started out as a separate profession, similar to bankers, merchants, and artisans. As suggested in certain epigraphs, they had a representative in the district-level  administration, along with those of bankers and merchants. Possibly secular knowledge, like writing, administration, and jurisprudence, was monopolised by a non-Brahmin professional elite that later came be referred as kayasthas.

History

From classical to early-medieval India 
The Kayasthas, at least as an office, played an important role in administering the Northern India from the Gupta period. The earliest evidence comes from a Mathura inscription of Vasudeva I, composed by a Kayastha Śramaṇa. From this point we find, the term kayastha occurring in the inscription of the Gupta Emperor Kumaragupta I as prathama-kāyastha, as karaṇa-kāyastha in Vainayagupta’s inscription, and as gauḍa-kāyastha in an Apshadha inscription dated 672 CE. The occasional references to individuals of the Karaṇa caste occupying high government offices are made in inscriptions and literary works too. Razia Banu has suggested that Brahmin and Kayastha migrants were brought to Bengal during the reign of the Gupta Empire to help manage the state affairs. According to a legend, a Bengali King named Adisur had invited Brahmins accompanied by Kayasthas from Kannauj who became an elite sub-group described as Kulin. However, such claims are disputable and even rejected by some scholars.

From the ninth-century and perhaps even earlier, Kayasthas had started to consolidate into a distinct caste. This is evident from a epigraphic record dated 871 CE of the King Amoghavarsha that mentions a branch of Kayasthas referred to as vālabhya-kāyastha. The author of the Sanskrit work Udayasundarī-kathā also referred to himself as vālabhya-kayāstha and characterized Kayasthas as 'ornaments of the Kṣatriyas'.

In Soḍḍhala’s account 
According to Soḍḍhala, who claimed to be a Kayastha himself, Kayasthas traced their descent to a younger brother of the Maitrika king, identified as Śilāditya VI or VII, referred to as Kalāditya. He narrates that Kalāditya had besieged Dharmapala of the Pala Dynasty that led to the victory of his elder brother. Subsequently, he was entrusted by Śilāditya to administer his kingdom at the advice of the Goddess Rāja Lakśmī. Kalāditya has been further described as an incarnation of a gaṇa of Shiva called Kayastha.

In Sanskrit literature 
The Mitākṣarā refers to Kayasthas as accountants and scribes, they are described as favorites of the king and cunning.

In Act V there is mention that:  

In , a Kayastha named Śakaṭadāsa is a crucial character and one of the trusted men of the Prime Minister of the Nanda King. According to Chitrarekha Gupta, the title Ārya added to the name of Śakaṭadāsa implies that he was a member of the nobility. Another Kayastha called Acala is the scribe of Chanakya.

In early-mediaeval Kashmir too, the term kayastha denoted an occupational class whose principal duty, besides carrying on the general administration of the state, consisted in the collection of revenue and taxes. Kalhana’s Rājataraṃgiṇī ('The River of Kings') and Bilhana's Vikramāṅkadevacarita ('Life of King Vikramaditya') also mention Kayasthas. It is also mentioned that father of Lalitaditya Muktapida of the Karkota Dynasty, Durlabhavardhan, had held the post of Aśvaghāsa-kāyastha.

Kayasthas have been authors of several Sanskrit texts too.

In Brahmanical literature 
Kayasthas have been recorded as a separate caste responsible for writing secular documents and maintaining records in Brahmanical religious writings dating back to the seventh-century. In these texts, some described Kayasthas as Kshatriyas, while others often described them as a 'mixed-origin' caste with Brahmin and Shudra components. This was probably an attempt by the Brahmins to rationalize their rank in the traditional caste hierarchy and perhaps a later invention rather than a historical fact.

Late medieval India 
In Bengal, during the reign of the Gupta Empire beginning in the 4th century, when systematic and large-scale colonisation by Indo-Aryan Kayasthas and Brahmins first took place, Kayasthas were brought over by the Guptas to help manage the affairs of state.

After the Muslim conquest of India, they mastered Persian, which became the official language of the Mughal courts. Some converted to Islam and formed the Muslim Kayasth community in northern India.

Bengali Kayasthas had been the dominant landholding caste prior to the Muslim conquest, and continued this role under Muslim rule. Indeed, Muslim rulers had from a very early time confirmed the Kayasthas in their ancient role as landholders and political intermediaries.

Bengali Kayasthas served as treasury officials and wazirs (government ministers) under Mughal rule. Political scientist U. A. B. Razia Akter Banu writes that, partly because of Muslim sultans' satisfaction with them as technocrats, many Bengali Kayasthas in the administration became zamindars and jagirdars. According to Abu al-Fazl, most of the Hindu zamindars in Bengal were Kayasthas.

Maharaja Pratapaditya, the king of Jessore who declared independence from Mughal rule in the early 17th century, was a Bengali Kayastha.

British India

During the British Raj, Kayasthas continued to proliferate in public administration, qualifying for the highest executive and judicial offices open to Indians.

Bengali Kayasthas took on the role occupied by merchant castes in other parts of India and profited from business contacts with the British. In 1911, for example, Bengali Kayasthas and Bengali Brahmins owned 40% of all the Indian-owned mills, mines and factories in Bengal.

Modern India
The Chitraguptavanshi Kayasthas, Bengali Kayasthas and CKPs were among the Indian communities in 1947, at the time of Indian independence, that constituted the middle class and were traditionally "urban and professional" (following professions like doctors, lawyers, teachers, engineers, etc.) According to P. K. Varma, "education was a common thread that bound together this pan Indian elite" and almost all the members of these communities could read and write English and were educated beyond school.

The Kayasthas today mostly inhabit central, eastern, northern India, and particularly Bengal. They are considered a Forward Caste, as they do not qualify for any of the reservation benefits allotted to Scheduled Castes and Scheduled Tribes and Other Backward Classes that are administered by the Government of India. This classification has increasingly led to feelings of unease and resentment among the Kayasthas, who believe that the communities that benefit from reservation are gaining political power and employment opportunities at their expense. Thus, particularly since the 1990 report of the Mandal Commission on reservation, Kayastha organisations have been active in areas such as Bihar, Madhya Pradesh, Bengal and Orissa. These groups are aligning themselves with various political parties to gain political and economic advantages; by 2009 they were demanding 33 percent reservation in government jobs.

Sub-groups

Chitraguptavanshi Kayasthas

The Chitraguptavanshi Kayasthas of Northern India are named thus because they have a myth of origin that says they descend from the 12 sons of the Hindu god Chitragupta, the product of his marriages to Devi Shobhavati and Devi Nandini. The suffix -vanshi is Sanskrit and translates as belonging to a particular family dynasty.

At least some Chitraguptavanshi subcastes seem to have formed by the 11th or 12th century, evidenced by various names being used to describe them in inscriptions. Although at that time, prior to the Muslim conquests in the Indian subcontinent, they were generally outnumbered by Brahmins in the Hindu royal courts of northern India, some among these Kayasthas wrote eulogies for the kings. Of the various regional Kayastha communities it was those of north India who remained most aligned to their role of scribes, whereas in other areas there became more emphasis on commerce.

The group of Bhatnagar, Srivastava, Ambashtha and Saxena of Doab were classified by various Indian, British and missionary observers to be the most learned and dominant of the "service castes".

Bengali Kayasthas 

In eastern India, Bengali Kayasthas are believed to have evolved from a class of officials into a caste between the 5th-6th centuries and 11th-12th centuries, its component elements being putative Kshatriyas and mostly Brahmins. They most likely gained the characteristics of a caste under the Sena dynasty. According to Tej Ram Sharma, an Indian historian, the Kayasthas of Bengal had not yet developed into a distinct caste during the reign of the Gupta Empire, although the office of the Kayastha (scribe) had been instituted before the beginning of the period, as evidenced from the contemporary Smritis. Sharma further states:

Chandraseniya Prabhu Kayasthas 

In Maharashtra, Chandraseniya Kayastha Prabhus (CKP) claim descent from the warrior Chandrasen. Historically they produced prominent warriors and also held positions such as Deshpandes and Gadkaris (fort holder, an office similar to that of a castellan. Traditionally, the CKPs have the upanayana (thread ceremony) and have been granted the rights to study the vedas and perform vedic rituals along with the Brahmins.

Karanas 

Karana is a caste found predominantly in Odisha and Andhra Pradesh. They are a regional subcaste of Kayastha and traditionally they were the official record-keepers in the royal courts during Medieval times. They represent around 5% of Odia people. The Karanas are a forward caste of Odisha.

Varna status
As the Kayasthas are a non-cohesive group with regional differences rather than a single caste, their position in the Hindu varna system of ritual classification has not been uniform.

This was reflected in Raj era court rulings. Hayden Bellenoit gives details of various Raj era law cases and concludes the varna Kayastha was resolved in those cases by taking into account regional differences and customs followed by the specific community under consideration. Bellenoit disagrees with Rowe, showing that Risley's theories were in fact used ultimately to classify them as Kshatriyas by the British courts. The first case began in 1860 in Jaunpur, Uttar Pradesh with a property dispute where the plaintiff was considered an "illegitimate child" by the defendants, a north-Indian Kayastha family. The British court denied inheritance to the child, citing that Kayasthas are Dvija, "twice-born" or "upper-caste" and that the illegitimate children of Dwijas have no rights to inheritance. In the next case in 1875 in the Allahabad High Court, a north Indian Kayastha widow was denied adoption rights as she was an upper-caste i.e. Dwija woman. However, the aforementioned 1884 adoption case and the 1916 property dispute saw the Calcutta High Court rule that the Bengali Kayasthas were shudras. The Allahabad High Court ruled in 1890 that Kayasthas were Kshatriyas. Hayden Bellenoit concludes from an analysis of those that  Even where the shudra designation was adjudged, the Raj courts appear to have sometimes recognised that the Bengali Kayasthas were degraded from an earlier kshatriya status due to intermarrying with both shudras and slaves ('dasa') which resulted in the common Bengali Kayastha surname of 'Das'. The last completed census of the British Raj (1931) classified them as an "upper caste", i.e. Dwija, and the final British Raj law case involving their varna in 1926 determined them to be Kshatriya.

Earlier, in Bihar, in 1811–1812, botanist and zoologist Francis Buchanan had recorded the Kayastha of that region as "pure shudra" and accordingly kept them at the par with other producer caste groups like goldsmiths, Ahirs, Kurmis and the Koeris. William Pinch, in his study of Ramanandi Sampradaya in the north describes the emergence of the concept of "pure Shudra" in growing need of physical contact with some of the low caste groups who were producer and seller of essential commodities or were the provider of services without which the self sufficiency  of rural society couldn't persist. However, many of these adopted Vaishnavism in the aim to become Kshatriya. In 1901 Bihar census, Kayasthas of the area were classified along with Brahmins and Rajputs in Bihar as "other castes of twice-born rank" According to Arun Sinha, there was a strong current since the end of the 19th century among Shudras of Bihar to change their status in caste hierarchy and break the monopoly of bipolar elite of  Brahmins and Rajputs of having "dvija" status. The education and economic advancement made by some of the former Shudra castes enabled them to seek the higher prestige and varna status. The Kayastha along with the Bhumihars were first among the shudras to attain the recognition as "upper caste" leaving the other aspirational castes to aspire for the same.
 
The Raj era rulings were based largely upon the theories of Herbert Hope Risley, who had conducted extensive studies on castes and tribes of the Bengal Presidency. According to William Rowe, the Kayasthas of Bengal, Bombay and the United Provinces repeatedly challenged this classification by producing a flood of books, pamphlets, family histories and journals to pressurise the government to recognise them as kshatriya and to reform the caste practices in the directions of sanskritisation and westernisation.
Rowe's opinion has been challenged, with arguments that it is based on "factual and interpretative errors", and criticised for making "unquestioned assumptions" about the Kayastha Sanskritisation and westernisation movement.

In post-Raj assessments, the Bengali Kayasthas, alongside Bengali Brahmins, have been described as the "highest Hindu castes". After the Muslim conquest of India, they absorbed remnants of Bengal's old Hindu ruling dynastiesincluding the Sena, Pala, Chandra, and Varmanand, in this way, became the region's surrogate kshatriya or "warrior" class. During British rule, the Bengali Kayasthas, the Bengali Brahmins and the Baidyas considered themselves to be Bhadralok, a term coined in Bengal for the gentry or respectable people. This was based on their perceived refined culture, prestige and education.

According to Christian Novetzke, in medieval India, Kayastha in certain parts were considered either as Brahmins or equal to Brahmins. Several religious councils and institutions have subsequently stated the varna status of CKPs as Kshatriya.

Notable people

This is a list of notable people from all the subgroups of Kayasthas.

President of India 
Rajendra Prasad

Prime Minister of India 
Lal Bahadur Shastri

Chief Ministers 
 Krishna Ballabh Sahay
 Mahamaya Prasad Sinha
 Uddhav Thackeray
 Shiv Charan Mathur
 Nabakrushna Choudhuri
 Biju Patnaik
 Biren Mitra
 Janaki Ballabh Patnaik
 Naveen Patnaik
 Sampurnanand
 Jyoti Basu

Others 
 Sri Aurobindo, Indian philosopher, yogi and nationalist
 Nagendranath Basu, historian and editor
Shankar Abaji Bhise (1867–1935), scientist and inventor with 200 inventions and 40 patents. The American scientific community referred to him as the "Indian Edison".
 Jagadish Chandra Bose, Indian scientist
Satyendra Nath BoseKnown for his work on quantum mechanics, for developing the foundation of Bose statistics and the theory of the Bose condensate. The class of particles that obey Bose statistics, bosons, was named after Bose by Paul Dirac.
 Subhas Chandra Bose
Mahadev Bhaskar Chaubal (1857–1933), Indian origin British era Chief Justice of the Bombay High Court. Member of Executive Council of Governor of Bombay in 1912 and Member of Royal Commission on Public Services in India.
 Har Dayal, Indian revolutionary and intellectual of the Ghadar party in the USA
C. D. Deshmukh (1896–1982), first recipient of the Jagannath Shankarseth Sanskrit Scholarship, topper of ICS Examination, first Indian Governor of RBI, first finance Minister of independent India and tenth vice chancellor of the University of Delhi
Baji Prabhu Deshpande (1615–1660), commander of Shivaji Maharaj's forces who along with his brother died defending Vishalgad in 1660
Murarbaji Deshpande (?–1665), commander of Shivaji Maharaj's forces who died defending the fort of Purandar against the Mughals in 1665
Jayaprakash Narayan (1902 -1979) - freedom fighter, social reformer and anti-corruption campaigner
Bipin Chandra Pal, Indian nationalist, writer, orator, social reformer and Indian independence movement activist of Lal Bal Pal triumvirate
Vithal Sakharam Parasnis (17xx-18xx)- Sanskrit, Vedic and Persian scholar; consultant to British Historian James Grant Duff; author of the Sanskrit "karma kalpadrum"(manual for Hindu rituals); first head of the school opened by Pratapsimha to teach Sanskrit to the boys of the Maratha caste
 Devdutt Pattanaik
Premchand (1880–1936) – author in Hindi language
Sachchidananda Sinha, lawyer prominent in the movement for establishing the state of Bihar
Mahadevi Varma
Bhagwati Charan Verma
Swami Vivekananda
 Paramahansa Yogananda, author of Autobiography of a Yogi

See also
 Karan Kayastha

References

Further reading

External links

 
Social groups of Uttar Pradesh
Social groups of Bihar
Social groups of Madhya Pradesh
Social groups of Jharkhand
Social groups of West Bengal
Bengali Hindu castes
Social groups of Maharashtra
Social groups of Odisha